Dancing on the Couch is the second studio album by the band Go West, released in 1987. It reached number 19 on the UK Albums Chart.

The American version of the album featured a slightly different cover (zoomed in further on the image of Cox and Drummie on the couch) and included the track "Don't Look Down – The Sequel" (a slightly enhanced version of a song from Go West's debut album) in place of "Let's Build a Boat". "Don't Look Down – The Sequel" would become Go West's first top 40 stateside hit.

Track listing

Personnel 

Go West
 Peter Cox – vocals, keyboards, drum programming, percussion, hi-hat
 Richard Drummie – vocals, keyboards, guitars, percussion

Additional musicians
 Dave West – keyboards, Fairlight programming, drum programming
 Peter-John Vettese – acoustic piano
 Alan Murphy – keyboards, guitars, guitar solos, percussion
 Chris Childs – bass
 Graham Edwards – bass
 Pino Palladino – bass
 Tony Beard – drums
 Graham Broad – cymbals, hi-hat
 Randy Brecker – trumpet, flugelhorn
 Kate Bush – backing vocals on "The King Is Dead"
 Mo Birch – backing vocals on "I Want to Hear It from You"

Chart performance

Production 
 Producer – Gary Stevenson
 Recording Engineers – John Gallen and Julian Mendelsohn 
 Track 1 remixed by Brian Malouf
 Track 2 mixed by John Gallen 
 Tracks 3-10 mixed by Julian Mendelsohn
 Recorded at Puk Studios (Denmark).
 Mastered by George Marino at Sterling Sound (New York, NY).
 Design – John Pasche
 Photography – Kevin Clarke
 Management – Blueprint Management

References 

1987 albums
Go West (band) albums
Chrysalis Records albums